Michael Adeniyi Agbolade Ishola Adenuga Jr   (born 29 April 1953) is a Nigerian billionaire businessman, and the sixth richest person in Africa. His company Globacom is Nigeria's second-largest telecom operator and also has a presence in Ghana and Benin. He owns stakes in the Equitorial Trust Bank and the oil exploration firm Conoil (formerly Consolidated Oil Company).

Forbes estimated his net worth at $6.2 billion as of May 2021.

Early life and education
His father, the Oloye Michael Agbolade Adenuga Sr, was a school teacher while his mother, Omoba Juliana Oyindamola Adenuga (née Onashile, of Okesopin, Ijebu Igbo), was a businesswoman of royal Ijebu descent.

Adenuga received his secondary school education at Ibadan Grammar School, Ibadan, Oyo State, Nigeria and Comprehensive High School, Aiyetoro, for his Higher School Certificate (HSC). He worked as a taxi driver to help fund his university education. He graduated from Northwestern Oklahoma State University and Pace University, New York, with degrees in Business Administration.

Career
Adenuga made his first million in 1979, at age 26, selling lace and distributing soft drinks.
In 1990, he received a drilling license and in 1991, his Consolidated Oil struck oil in the shallow waters of Southwestern Ondo State, the first indigenous oil company to do so in commercial quantity.

He was issued a conditional GSM licence in 1999; after it was revoked, he received a second one when the government held another auction in 2003.

He was named African Entrepreneur of The Year at the first African Telecoms Awards (ATA) in August 2007.

In May 2015, Adenuga made a takeover bid to purchase Ivorian mobile telecom's operator Comium Côte d'Ivoire for $600 million.

Honours
In 2012, he was made Grand Commander of the Order of the Niger by the government of Nigeria.

He holds a Yoruba tribal chieftaincy as the Otunba Apesin of the Ijebu clan.

In 2018, he was decorated with the insignia of a Commander of the Legion of Honour by President Emmanuel Macron of France.

Adenuga was cited as one of the Top 100 most influential Africans by New African magazine in 2019.

See also
List of Yoruba people

References

External links
 

1953 births
Living people
Yoruba businesspeople
Yoruba royalty
Businesspeople from Ibadan
Nigerian businesspeople in the oil industry
Businesspeople in telecommunications
Nigerian billionaires
Northwestern Oklahoma State University alumni
Pace University alumni
Nigerian expatriates in the United Kingdom
Recipients of Nigerian presidential pardons
20th-century Nigerian businesspeople
21st-century Nigerian businesspeople
Nigerian royalty
Grand Commanders of the Order of the Niger
Ibadan Grammar School alumni
Nigerian investors
Nigerian taxi drivers
Nigerian chairpersons of corporations